Jonte Grundelius (born 26 December 1975) is a Swedish snowboarder. He competed in the men's snowboard cross event at the 2006 Winter Olympics.

References

1975 births
Living people
Swedish male snowboarders
Olympic snowboarders of Sweden
Snowboarders at the 2006 Winter Olympics
Sportspeople from Västerås
21st-century Swedish people